Robert Maynard Murray (November 28, 1841 – August 2, 1913) was an attorney, banker, businessman and member of the United States House of Representatives from Ohio for one term from 1883 to 1885.

Life and career 
Robert M. Murray was born in Concord, Ohio, the son of Robert and Sophrenia Murray II.  The family moved to Mentor, Ohio when Robert was five years old, where he attended local public schools until age 15 then the Western Reserve Teachers' Seminary at Kirtland, Ohio and the Willoughby Academy at Willoughby, Ohio.  He attended Oberlin College but decided on a career in law.

He was admitted to the United States and Ohio bar after graduating from the Cleveland Law School.  He joined the firm of Ranney, Backus & Noble until 1864 when he answered the call during the Civil War for Hundred Days Men and served in Company D, 150th Ohio Infantry.  He returned to the practice of law until 1867.

In 1867 he joined the family banking business in Painesville, Ohio for nine years and was collector, bookkeeper and then cashier of the First National Bank of Painesville.  In 1874 he became a member of the school board in Painesville for three years and subsequently was elected mayor of Painesville, serving from 1877 to 1879.

In 1879 Robert M. Murray removed to Piqua, Ohio, engaging in the manufacture of handles for agricultural implements.

Congress 
In 1882 he was narrowly elected as a Democrat from Ohio's third district to the Forty-eighth Congress from Ohio's third district.  He was an unsuccessful candidate for reelection in 1884.

Later career and death 
After his congressional service, he resumed his former business pursuits in Piqua.  He moved to Cleveland, Ohio in 1892 and engaged in the storage business.  He died Cleveland and was interred in Evergreen Cemetery, Painesville, Ohio.

References
 Retrieved on 2008-11-01
 Taylor, William A. Ohio in Congress from 1803 to 1901. Columbus, Ohio: The XX Century Publishing Company, 1900.
 History of Geauga and Lake Counties, Ohio. Philadelphia: Williams Brothers (Press of J. B. Lippencott & Co.), 1878.

1841 births
1913 deaths
Oberlin College alumni
People from Painesville, Ohio
Union Army soldiers
Cleveland–Marshall College of Law alumni
19th-century American politicians
Ohio lawyers
People of Ohio in the American Civil War
Mayors of places in Ohio
School board members in Ohio
Businesspeople from Ohio
19th-century American businesspeople
19th-century American lawyers
Democratic Party members of the United States House of Representatives from Ohio